Q'ara Wayuna (Quechua q'ara bare, naked, wayuna basket, "bare basket", Hispanicized spelling Jarahuayuna) is a mountain in the Chunta mountain range in the Andes of Peru, about  high. It is located in the Huancavelica Region, Castrovirreyna Province, on the border of the districts of Aurahuá and Castrovirreyna. It lies southwest of Sukullu and a lake named Antaqucha ("copper lake", Hispanicized Antacocha).

References

Mountains of Huancavelica Region
Mountains of Peru